A wetness indicator is a common feature in many disposable diapers and toilet training pants. It is a feature that reacts to exposure of liquid as a way to discourage the wearer to urinate in the training pants, or as an indicator a caregiver that a diaper needs changing.

Types
 "Fade when wet" is a feature in most training pants that has small graphics which fade as a reaction to liquid, specifically urine.

"Feel wet" is a feature used in some training pants that lets the wearer know when they are wet by feeling. Nowadays few training pants use this feature.
"Color Change When Wet" is a feature in most modern baby and adult diapers that has a yellow stripe or graphics that goes from the front to the back of the diaper that which turns blue after a minute or two as a reaction of liquid, during the transition when the indicator is activated the indicator fades or turns an amber color before turning blue, over time the indicator becomes less yellow and more blue as the diaper gets used more often to let the wearer or the caregiver know when the diaper needs to be changed.

History
In 1978, Kimberly-Clark introduced Kleenex Super Dry diapers with "wetness indicators" in the form of a design that fades and lightens as the inside of the diaper becomes wetter. (The Kleenex Super Dry line was later superseded by Kimberley-Clark's higher-end "Huggies" line.)

In 2000, Huggies introduced and started integrating their new "Learning Designs" feature into all Huggies Pull-Ups training pants. These were small designs on the Pull-Up that use a special ink that fades when exposed to wetness, with an intent to let the wearer know when the wearer is wet or dry and as an incentive for urinating in the toilet instead of in the Pull-Up. But on March 2, 2005, the original Huggies Pull-Ups are now known as Learning Designs. Learning Designs Pull-Ups also have a small star picture on the inside that is digested on, that is also printed on certain ink that evaporates when exposed to feces.

In 2002, Pampers introduced Easy Ups trainers, which adopted the Learning Designs technique from Huggies Pull-Ups.

In 2004, Pampers introduced Feel 'N Learn trainers, which not only used the Learning Designs, but also added a wetness liner that lets the wearer know when they are wet by feeling.

In 2005, Huggies released Pull-Ups Training Pants with Wetness Liner, similar to Pampers Feel 'N Learn.

References

Toilet training